Binay Kumar Choudhary is an Indian politician. He is a member of the Janata Dal (United) from Bihar. He was elected as a member of the 2020 Bihar Legislative Assembly election from Benipur (Vidhan Sabha constituency). His niece, Pushpam Priya Choudhary, is the president of The Plurals Party.

References

Living people
People from Darbhanga district
Janata Dal (United) politicians
Year of birth missing (living people)